Selaqai (also Romanized as Selāqa’ī and Selāqā’ī) is a village in Ilat-e Qaqazan-e Gharbi Rural District, Kuhin District, Qazvin County, Qazvin Province, Iran. At the 2006 census, its population was 153, in 36 families.

References 

Populated places in Qazvin County